Uruashraju (possibly from the regional Quechua spelling, urwa infertile, sterile; corn plant without corncob used as fodder, rahu snow, ice, mountain with snow) or Verdecocha (possibly from Spanish verde green, Quechua qucha lake, "green lake") is a mountain in the Cordillera Blanca of the Andes of Peru, about  high. It is located in the Ancash Region, Huaraz Province, Olleros District, and in the Huari Province, Chavín de Huantar District. Uruashraju lies south of Huantsán, east of Cashán and Shacsha, and southeast of Lake Tararhua (Lake Verdecocha).

References

Mountains of Peru
Mountains of Ancash Region